Sing and Dance with Frank Sinatra is the sixth studio album by Frank Sinatra. The tracks were arranged and conducted by George Siravo and his orchestra (except for track four, which was conducted by Hugo Winterhalter). Original Columbia 10-inch 33 1/3-rpm LP and 78-rpm album set released October 16, 1950; the 7-inch 45-rpm EP and EP box sets were released in October 1952. (See Gramophone record for an explanation of these formats.)

It would prove to be the final album that Sinatra released under the Columbia label, another three years before he would start recording for Capitol and another year after that before his next album, entitled Songs for Young Lovers, would be released in 1954.  Six of the eight songs on this LP would be remade for one of his contractual obligation albums to Capitol, Sinatra's Swingin' Session!!!.

For its compact disc reissue in 1996, alternate versions of six songs – including "I've Got a Crush on You" and "All of Me" – are included. The extra songs in this compilation, titled slightly differently as Swing and Dance with Frank Sinatra, were recorded between 1944 and 1951.

Personnel
 Frank Sinatra - Vocals
 Musicians - 1949 : Hugo Winterhalter (conductor), Yank Lawson, Carl Poole, Russ Solomon (trumpets), John D'Agostino, Buddy Morrow aka Moe Zydecoff, William Pritchard (trombones), Ernie Caceres (baritone saxophone/clarinet/alto saxophone), Wolf Taninbaum, Henry Ross (tenor saxophone/clarinet), Toots Mondello, Sid Cooper (alto saxophone/clarinet), Johnny Guarnieri (piano), Al Caiola (guitar), Trigger Alpert (bass), Terry Snyder (drums)
 Musicians - 1950 : George Siravo (conductor), Billy Butterfield, Steve Lipkins, Carl Poole, Pinky Savitt (trumpets), George Arus, William Rausch (trombones), Ernie Caceres (baritone saxophone/clarinet/alto saxophone), Emmett Callen (alto saxophone), Art Drelinger (alto saxophone/clarinet/oboe/bass clarinet), Leonard Hartman (tenor saxophone/clarinet/bass clarinet), Jimmy Horvath (alto saxophone), Jerry Jerome (tenor saxophone/clarinet), Babe Russin (tenor saxophone), Hymie Schertzer (alto saxophone/clarinet/baritone saxophone), Ken Lane (piano/celeste), Bernie Leighton (piano), Allan Reuss (guitar), Phil Stephens (bass), Johnny Blowers (drums)

Expanded CD produced by Charles L. Granata & Didier C. Deutsch

Track listing

Original ("Sing and Dance with Frank Sinatra")

Re-issue ("Swing and Dance with Frank Sinatra") track listing

All tracks arranged and conducted by George Siravo except for the marked songs:
* arranged & conducted by Axel Stordahl
** arranged & conducted by Hugo Winterhalter
*** arranged & conducted by Harry James

References

Frank Sinatra albums
1950 albums
Columbia Records albums
Albums arranged by Axel Stordahl
Albums conducted by Axel Stordahl
Albums arranged by Hugo Winterhalter
Albums conducted by Hugo Winterhalter
Albums arranged by Harry James
Albums conducted by Harry James
Albums arranged by George Siravo
Albums conducted by George Siravo